Oklahoma City Golf & Country Club is a private golf and country club located in Nichols Hills, Oklahoma.

Course founding
The course was founded in 1911 by 300 Oklahoma City residents. The course, designed by architect Perry Maxwell, measures 6,861 yards from the championship tees and plays to a par 71 with a course rating of 73.5 and a slope of 130. The course features tree-lined fairways throughout the rolling hills.  Eleven of the holes have water hazards in play—either ponds or winding creeks—to challenge even the finest players.  The course has been recognized by Golf Digest as one of the state's premier courses.

Tournaments hosted

The Club has hosted several regional and national tournaments, including:

 1953 U.S. Amateur (Gene Littler beat Dale Morey on the last hole)
 Oklahoma City Open (1926, 1927, 1928, 1929)
 1930 Southwest Invitational Amateur
 Trans-Mississippi Amateur (six times dating back to 1932)
 Women's Southern Open (1936)
 1937 Oklahoma Four Ball
 Western Amateur (1939)
 Women’s Western Open (1949)
 NCAA Division I Southwest Regional (1994)
 Numerous men's and women's U.S. Amateur qualifying tournaments
 Numerous U.S. Open qualifying tournaments

Scorecard

References

External links
 

Oklahoma City
Golf clubs and courses in Oklahoma
Sports venues in Oklahoma